Western Fruit Express (WFE) was a railroad refrigerator car leasing company formed by the Fruit Growers Express and the Great Northern Railway on July 18, 1923 in order to compete with the Pacific Fruit Express and Santa Fe Refrigerator Despatch in the Western United States. The arrangement added 3,000 cars to the FGE's existing equipment pool. It is now a wholly owned subsidiary of the Burlington Northern Santa Fe Corporation (BNSF), the Great Northern's successor.
The success of the WFE led to the creation of the Burlington Refrigerator Express (BREX) in May 1926.

Western Fruit Express Roster, 1930–1970:

Source: The Great Yellow Fleet, p. 17.

Notes

References
 White, John H.  (1986).  The Great Yellow Fleet.  Golden West Books, San Marino, CA.  .

External links
 The Florida Railroad Company Inc. / The Fruit Growers Express Company History of FGE

Transport companies established in 1923
Refrigerator car lines of the United States
Great Northern Railway (U.S.)
Burlington Northern Railroad
BNSF Railway
Joint ventures
1923 establishments in the United States